Myrtle Springs Station is a pastoral lease that operates as a sheep station in outback South Australia.

Description
The property adjoins Beltana and Leigh Creek Stations. It is on the western side of the northern Flinders Ranges where the ranges stop and the flat plains of the Lake Torrens basin starts. The area is mostly sand dunes interspersed with claypans.

History
The pastoral lease was first taken up by Henry McConville in 1864. Shortly afterwards, the area was struck by drought until 1866. When the drought broke, the station's flock had been reduced to 3000 sheep. Unfortunately the rains that broke the drought made the ground boggy and further reduced the flock to 500. McConville then entered a partnership with William Baines in both Myrtle Springs and neighbouring Mirrabuckina Station. The flock eventually increased to 11,000.

Baines and McConville placed the property on the market in late 1872, and it was bought by Alexander Borthwick Murray in partnership with George Tinline in 1873. The property was advertised as having many improvements such as yards, huts and the headstation. It was estimated to have a carrying capacity of 29,000 sheep.

Murray and Tinline ran sheep on the property. In 1876 the area recorded good rains with about  falling in a one-day period. This left the station isolated for a time and also caused the loss of 5,000 sheep and 17 horses. 

By 1898 the lease was held by Leonard Browne who also held the lease to Leigh's Creek Station. 

By 1907 the property was owned by the Matheson brothers who put it on the market the following year.

Richard Dawes sold the property in 1920 to John Cowan and John Lindo.

The purchasers were A. S. Toll, E. G. and J. L. Boynthon who had established the Myrtle Springs Pastoral company.

In April 2013, the land occupying the extent of the Myrtle Springs pastoral lease was gazetted by the Government of South Australia as a locality under the name ' Myrtle Springs'.

See also
List of ranches and stations

References

Stations (Australian agriculture)
Pastoral leases in South Australia
Far North (South Australia)
1864 establishments in Australia